

598001–598100 

|-bgcolor=#f2f2f2
| colspan=4 align=center | 
|}

598101–598200 

|-bgcolor=#f2f2f2
| colspan=4 align=center | 
|}

598201–598300 

|-bgcolor=#f2f2f2
| colspan=4 align=center | 
|}

598301–598400 

|-bgcolor=#f2f2f2
| colspan=4 align=center | 
|}

598401–598500 

|-bgcolor=#f2f2f2
| colspan=4 align=center | 
|}

598501–598600 

|-bgcolor=#f2f2f2
| colspan=4 align=center | 
|}

598601–598700 

|-bgcolor=#f2f2f2
| colspan=4 align=center | 
|}

598701–598800 

|-id=719
| 598719 Alegalli ||  || Alejandro Galli (born 1964), an Uruguayan amateur astronomer and popularizer of astronomy in South America, who studies small Solar System bodies, meteor showers and variable stars. || 
|}

598801–598900 

|-bgcolor=#f2f2f2
| colspan=4 align=center | 
|}

598901–599000 

|-bgcolor=#f2f2f2
| colspan=4 align=center | 
|}

References 

598001-599000